Rattlesnake Remedy was a hard rock band from Birmingham, England. The band was influenced by artists such as The Rolling Stones, Aerosmith, Led Zeppelin, Free, Pantera, and Black Sabbath. Its members changed their name to Caduga in 2009.

Rattlesnake Remedy played alongside artists such as Buckcherry, Ted Nugent, Coheed and Cambria and Thunder.

“It's as if one of the biggest rock acts in the world has just landed, disguised. Its not just the music which is breathtaking and flawless, it's the energy, the spring, the communication with an increasingly hysterical audience. Being the hardest touring blues-based rock band in the UK has turned them into one of our finest. KKKKK” - Kerrang!

"The rock world can thank its lucky stars that there are bands like Rattlesnake Remedy" - Classic Rock

The band met whilst at school, and in 2006 the band recorded its debut album, Magic Man. It was released in the UK and Ireland on 30 October on BEM Records and distributed by Universal Music. The first single from the album, "Drag You Down", was released on 1 May 2006 and went straight into the Radio 1 UK Rock Charts at number four where it remained for over two months. This and other tracks appeared in Classic Rock, Player Magazine, and Metal Hammer. Promotion of the single and new album began with the Drag You Down tour running through 2006. The music video to the album's title track was released in October 2006. The band continued to tour throughout 2007, and released a re-mastered version of Magic Man, with bonus tracks, in Japan and Europe in November 2007. The remastered, extended Magic Man was released on 21 November 2007 in Japan and 21 February 2008 in Most European territories.

In 2009, whilst recording their new studio album, the band announced that they would be changing the name to Caduga. They justified this change to their fans with a famous Picasso quote - "Every act of creation is first of all an act of destruction." The band split in 2011 after playing one final gig as Caduga.

Discography

Singles and EPs
2006 Drag You Down EP ("Drag You Down", "Reach for the Line", "Killing Time", "Angels Eyes")
2006 Drag You Down Single ("Drag You Down", "Black Sheep Fiddle", "Hangover Blues [Live]")

Albums
2003 Rattlesnake Remedy
 "So damn tight"
 "Round again"
 "Don't call"
 "Falling away"
 "Tickin again"
 "Killing time"
 "Angel's eyes"
 "The flame (never die)"
 "Dancing with the Devil"
 "When will I see you again"

2006 Magic Man

 "Black Sheep Fiddle" - 4:05
 "Drag You Down" - 4:16
 "Free to Feel" - 3:50
 "Payin' My Dues" - 3.16
 "Reach for the Line" - 3.07
 "Killing Time" - 3.59
 "Angels Eyes" - 3.47
 "Nothing Right" - 5.02
 "Falling Away" - 2.43
 "Freestyle" - 4.02
 "Magic Man" - 5.11
 "Don't Say Goodbye" - 2.40

2007 Magic Man Japanese version (4 bonus tracks)
 "Black Sheep Fiddle" - 4:05
 "Drag You Down" - 4:16
 "Free to Feel" - 3:50
 "Payin' My Dues" - 3.16
 "Reach for the Line" - 3.07
 "Killing Time" - 3.59
 "Angels Eyes" - 3.47
 "Nothing Right" - 5.02
 "Falling Away" - 2.43
 "Freestyle" - 4.02
 "Magic Man" - 5.11
 "Don't Say Goodbye" - 2.40
 "Up In Smoke" - 4.45
 "When Will I See You Again" - 3.16
 "Lonely Avenue (live)" - 3.07
 "Hangover Blues (live)" - 4.14

References 

English rock music groups